2009 was the Huddersfield Giants' 146th year in rugby league, entering their eleventh Super League season and the 2009 Challenge Cup.

Transfers
Transfers for 2009 (In)

Transfers for 2009 (Out)

Full squad

Fixtures and results

League table

External links
 Huddersfield Giants' official website

Huddersfield Giants seasons
Huddersfield Giants season